The Manchuria Airplane Manufacturing Company (traditional:滿洲國飛行機製造株式會社; shinjitai: 満州国飛行機製造株式会社 Japanese Hepburn: Manshū Koku Hikōki Seizō Kabushiki Kaisha; Chinese ) was an aircraft company in Manchukuo in the 1930s and 1940s, producing a variety of mostly military aircraft and aircraft components. It was named Manshū or Mansyuu in short.

History

The Manchuria Airplane Manufacturing Company was established in late 1938 under the supervision of the Japanese government as a subsidiary of the Nakajima Aircraft Company of Japan. Its main plant was located in Harbin, Manchukuo.

From 1941 to 1945, Manshū produced a total of 2,196 airframes (eighth among Japanese airframe manufacturers), of which 798 were combat aircraft. The company also produced 2,168 aircraft engines (sixth among Japanese aircraft engine manufacturers). In addition, Manshū provided repair services for a variety of aircraft in the Manchukuo Air Force and for Imperial Japanese Army Air Force units stationed in Manchukuo.

Licensed production

Manshū produced a variety of Japanese aircraft under license production agreements:

 Kawasaki Ki-10 (World War II Allied reporting name "Perry") fighter
 Kawasaki Ki-32 (Allied reporting name "Mary") light bomber
 Kawasaki Ki-45 Toryu (Allied reporting name "Nick") twin-engined fighter
 Kawasaki Ki-61 Hien (Allied reporting name "Tony") fighter
 Kawasaki Type 88 (KDA-2) light bomber and reconnaissance aircraft
 Mitsubishi Ki-15 (Allied reporting name "Babs") reconnaissance aircraft
 Mitsubishi Ki-30 (Allied reporting name "Ann") light bomber
 Mitsubishi Ki-46 (Allied reporting name "Dinah") reconnaissance aircraft
 Manshū Super Universal (license built Fokker Super Universal)
 Nakajima Ki-27 (Allied reporting name "Nate") light fighter (1,379 units)
 Nakajima Ki-34 (Allied reporting name "Thora") transport
 Nakajima Ki-43Ia Hayabusa (Allied reporting name "Oscar") fighter
 Nakajima Ki-44Ia Shoki (Allied reporting name "Tojo") fighter
 Nakajima Ki-84 Hayate (Allied reporting name "Frank") advanced fighter (94 units)
 Nakajima Ki-116 advanced fighter, also known as Manshū Ki-116
 Nakajima Type 91 (NC) fighter
 Tachikawa Ki-9 (Allied reporting name "Spruce") intermediate trainer
 Tachikawa Ki-54 (Allied reporting name "Hickory") advanced trainer
 Tachikawa Ki-55 (Allied reporting name "Ida") advanced trainer

Independent designs

Manshū also developed a number of aircraft independently:

 Manshū Hayabusa I, II, and III airliner (30 units)
 Manshū Ki-79 advanced trainer version of Nakajima Ki-27
 Manshū Ki-71 dive bomber prototype (Allied reporting name "Edna")
 Mansyū Ki-98 advanced twin-boom high-altitude interceptor project

Among the Manshū independent designs, however, only the Ki-79 advanced trainer reached mass production, as the Army Type 2 Advanced Trainer.

References
Notes

Bibliography

External links
Pacific War Online Encyclopedia

Defunct aircraft manufacturers of Japan
Companies in Manchukuo